Marco Chiudinelli won in the final 6–3, 6–4, against Paolo Lorenzi.

Seeds

Draw

Final four

Top half

Bottom half

References
Main Draw
Qualifying Draw

Singles